The 2014 Florida A&M Rattlers football team represented as the Florida A&M University in the 2014 NCAA Division I FCS football season. The Rattlers were led by their second year head coach Earl Holmes for the first eight games. In mid-season, he was fired. Holmes was replaced by Corey Fuller for the remainder of the season. They played their home games at Bragg Memorial Stadium. They were the members of the Mid-Eastern Athletic Conference. They finished the season with a disappointing 3–9 record and a 3–5 in MEAC play to finish in a tie for seventh place which and did not qualify for post-season play.

If they had qualified for the post-season, the Rattlers would've been ineligible to participate in post season play due to several APR violations.

Schedule

References

Florida AandM
Florida A&M Rattlers football seasons
Florida AandM Rattlers football